Keshia Doody (born 23 November 1988) is a Gibraltarian footballer who plays as a defender for Algeciras and the Gibraltar women's national team.

Club career 
After a spell at Lions Gibraltar, Doody moved to Spain in 2020 to sign for newly formed 4th tier side ADC Esteponense. She scored 9 goals in her first season at the club.

International career 
Doody made her senior debut for Gibraltar on 24 June 2021 in a 1–4 friendly away loss to Liechtenstein.

References 

Living people
Gibraltarian women's footballers
Women's association football defenders
Lions Gibraltar F.C. Women players
ADC Esteponense players
Gibraltar women's international footballers
Gibraltarian expatriate footballers
1988 births
Expatriate women's footballers in Spain
Gibraltarian expatriate sportspeople in Spain